Alstonia penangiana is a species of plant in the family Apocynaceae. It is a tree endemic to Peninsular Malaysia.

References

penangiana
Endemic flora of Peninsular Malaysia
Trees of Peninsular Malaysia
Vulnerable flora of Asia
Taxonomy articles created by Polbot